Midget cars, also speedcars in Australia, is a class of racing cars. The cars are very small with a very high power-to-weight ratio and typically use four cylinder engines. They originated in the United States in the 1930s and are raced on most continents. There is a worldwide tour and national midget tours in the United States, Australia, and New Zealand.

Cars 
The high power and small size of the cars combine to make midget racing quite dangerous; for this reason, modern midget cars are fully equipped with roll cages and other safety features. Some early major midget car manufacturers include Kurtis Kraft (1930s to 1950s) and Solar (1944–46). Midgets are intended to be driven for races of relatively short distances, usually 2.5 to 25 miles (4 to 40 km). Some events are staged inside arenas, like the Chili Bowl held in early January at the Tulsa Expo Center in Tulsa, Oklahoma. There are midget races in dirt track racing and in asphalt (paved tracks).

There are three-quarter (TQ) midgets which developed from "midget midget" cars of the late 1940s. Quarter midgets are the one quarter the size of a full midget car.

History 

The first organized Midget car race happened on June 4, 1933. The sports' first regular weekly program began on August 10, 1933 at the Loyola High School Stadium in Los Angeles under the control of the first official governing body, the Midget Auto Racing Association (MARA). After spreading across the country, the sport traveled around the world; first to Australia in 1934 at Melbourne's Olympic Park on December 15, and to New Zealand in 1937. Early midget races were held on board tracks previously used for bicycle racing. When the purpose built speedway at Gilmore Stadium was completed, racing ended at the school stadium, and hundreds of tracks began to spring up across the United States. Angell Park Speedway in Sun Prairie, Wisconsin (near Madison) is another major track in the United States operating since the first half of the twentieth century.

The AAA Contest Board soon started sanctioning midget races across the country, facing opposition from independent drivers and racetracks. After the AAA withdrew from sanctioning races in 1955, the United States Auto Club took over as the major sanctioning body of midget car racing in the United States. NASCAR had a midget division from 1952 to 1968.

Soon after in Australia, speedcar racing became popular with the first Australian Speedcar Championship being contested in Melbourne in 1935, its popularity running through the country's "golden era" of the 1950s and 1960s. Australian promoters such as Adelaide's Kym Bonython who ran the Rowley Park Speedway, and Empire Speedways who ran the Brisbane Exhibition Ground and the famous Sydney Showground Speedway, often imported drivers from the US, such as the popular Jimmy Davies. Promoters in Australia during this period often staged races billed as either a "world speedcar championship" or "world speedcar derby". During this time speedcars were arguably the most popular category in Australian speedway with crowds of up to 30,000 attending meetings at the Sydney Showground and over 10,000 in Adelaide and Brisbane.

Speedcars continue to race in Australia, with the major events being the Australian Championship, and the Australian Speedcar Grand Prix (first run in 1938). Along with various state championships, there is also the Speedcar Super Series which travels throughout Australia. Speedcar crowds of 10,000 people are common in Australia for these major events.

In December 2013, POWRi Midget Racing began a 16-event Lucas Oil POWRi Midget World Championship that ran until June 2014. Drivers competed in New Zealand and Australia at the beginning of the 2013–14 season and ended in the United States.

Midget car racing also grew in popularity in the Northeast of the United States, in part due to racers like Bill Schindler and events at tracks like that at Hinchcliffe Stadium.

Stepping stone to high profile divisions 
Many IndyCar and NASCAR drivers used midget car racing as an intermediate stepping stone on their way to more high-profile divisions, including Tony Stewart, Sarah Fisher, Jeff Gordon, A. J. Foyt, Mario Andretti, Kasey Kahne, Ryan Newman, Kyle Larson , Art Pollard  Christopher Bell , Chase Briscoe and others. The events are sometimes held on weeknights so that popular and famous drivers from other, higher-profiled types of motor racing (who race in those higher-profiled types of racing on the weekends) will be available to compete, and so that it does not conflict with drivers' home tracks.

Notable midget car races 
In 1959 Lime Rock Park held a famous Formula Libre race, where Rodger Ward shocked the expensive and exotic sports cars by beating them on the road course in an Offenhauser powered midget car, usually used on oval tracks. Ward used an advantageous power-to-weight ratio and dirt-track cornering abilities to steal the win.

Notable annual midget car racing events 
 Chili Bowl – Tulsa Expo Center, Tulsa, Oklahoma
 Fireman Nationals – Angell Park Speedway, Sun Prairie, Wisconsin
 Four Crown Nationals – Eldora Speedway, Allen Township, Darke County, Ohio
 Hut Hundred – Terre Haute Action Track, Terre Haute, Indiana
 Bryan Clauson Classic - Indianapolis Motor Speedway, Speedway, Indiana
 Night before the 500 – O'Reilly Raceway Park, Indianapolis, Indiana
 The Rumble in Fort Wayne – Allen County War Memorial Coliseum Expo Center, Fort Wayne, Indiana
 Turkey Night Grand Prix – Ventura Raceway, Irwindale Speedway
 World 50-lap Classic – Western Springs Stadium, Auckland, New Zealand
 New Zealand Midget Championship – Rotates on various tracks throughout New Zealand
 Australian Speedcar Championship – Rotates on various tracks throughout Australia
 Australian Speedcar Grand Prix – Rotates between tracks throughout eastern Australia
 Magic Man 34 – Perth Motorplex Speedway, Kwinana Beach, Western Australia
 Tim Crouch Memorial – Murray Bridge Speedway, Murray Bridge, South Australia
 Boston Louie Memorial – Seekonk Speedway, Seekonk, Massachusetts

Sanctioning bodies

Australia 
 SpeedcarsAustralia.com – Official website of Australia's Speedcar governing body, Speedcars Australia Inc
 QSRA – Queensland Speedcar Racing Assos. Official Website.
 SAspeedcars.com – South Australian Speedcar Association (covers South Australia & the Northern Territory)
V.S.D.A – Victorian Speedcar Drivers Association Inc
 wasda.com.au – Western Australian Speedcar Drivers Association (Perth Club)
 Speedcar Association of NSW (Sydney Club)
 50 Lap Speedcar Classic, Valvoline Raceway/Sydney Speedway, New South Wales, Australia

New Zealand 
 Speedway New Zealand
 New Zealand Speedway Directory Links to New Zealand Speedway Websites
 Macgors NZ Speedway

United Kingdom 
 Grand Prix Midget Club

United States 

 National

 USAC – USAC National Midget Series
 POWRi – POWRi Midget Series

 Regional

 BMARA – Badger Midget Auto Racing Association (the oldest sanctioning body)
 POWRi West Lucas Oil Midget Series
 AMRA – Arizona Midget Racing Association
 ARDC – American Racing Drivers Club
 BCRA – Bay Cities Racing Association (co-sanction with POWRi since 2019)
 NEMA – Northeastern Midget Association
 American Three Quarter Midget Racing Association
 STARS– Short Track Auto Racing Series
 RMMRA – Rocky Mountain Midget Racing Association
 SMRS – Southern Midget Racing Series
 IRS – Illini Racing Series
 USSA – United States Speed Association
 WMRA – Washington Midget Racing Association
 SMMS Southern States Midget Series
 Northwest Focus Midget Series

See also 
 Shortcar
 National Midget Auto Racing Hall of Fame
 Chili Bowl
 Australian Speedcar Championship
 Australian Speedcar Grand Prix

References

External links 
 New Zealand Speedway Results
 "Midgets of the Roaring Road" Popular Mechanics, October 1934
 Highbanks Hall of Fame & National Midget Auto Racing Museum
 National Midget Auto Racing Hall of Fame